This is list of archives in Bosnia and Herzegovina.

Archives in Bosnia and Herzegovina 
 Archives of Republika Srpska
 Historical Archive of the City of Sarajevo

See also 

 List of archives
 List of libraries in Bosnia and Herzegovina
 List of museums in Bosnia and Herzegovina
 Culture of Bosnia and Herzegovina

External links 
 http://www.arhivbih.gov.ba

 
Archives
Bosnia and Herzegovina
Archives